Luise Kautsky (née Ronsperger, 11 August 1864 – 8 December 1944) was a German politician and member of the USPD.

Life and career 
Kautsky was a Socialist and active Social Democrat. She married the prominent Marxist theorist Karl Kautsky.  She was also a friend of Rosa Luxemburg and Berlin city councilor for the USPD. 

In 1938, because she was Jewish, she had to flee to Prague and then the Netherlands.  In 1944 she was deported from Westerbork to Auschwitz, where she died "from heart failure" (an official Nazi formula for everyone who died in Auschwitz).

The S-bahn arch between Kantstraße and Fasanenstraße in Charlottenburg-Wilmersdorf is named after her. In 1999, Charlottenburg district council resolved to erect a plaque in her memory at Wielandstraße 26.

Notes

External links 
 Stolperstein memorial stones project

1864 births
1944 deaths
Independent Social Democratic Party politicians
Jewish German politicians
Jewish socialists
German people who died in Auschwitz concentration camp
20th-century German women politicians
German Jews who died in the Holocaust
Karl Kautsky